Kedungkandang is the easternmost district (kecamatan) in Malang City, East Java, Indonesia. Almost half of this area is dominated by paddy fields and other agricultural lands. Malang old town (kotalama) also located in Kedungkandang.

Subdistricts
There are 12 subdistricts (kelurahan) in Kedungkandang:

 Mergosono, postal code 65134
 Bumiayu, postal code 65135
 Wonokoyo, postal code 65135
 Buring, postal code 65136
 Lesanpuro, postal code 65138
 Madyopuro, postal code 65138
 Sawojajar, postal code 65139
 Arjowinangun, postal code 65132
 Cemorokandang, postal code 65138
 Kedungkandang, postal code 65137
 Tlogowaru, postal code 65133
Kotalama, postal code 65136 (Kotalama in English means old town, because the history of early Malang settlements located in this subdistrict).

Geography
Northern side of Kedungkandang bordering with Blimbing district, eastern and southern side bordering with Malang Regency, and western side of Kedungkandang bordering with the Sukun and Lowokwaru districts.

Climate
The climate in Kedungkandang features tropical monsoon climate (Am) according to Köppen–Geiger climate classification system, as the climate precipitation throughout the year is greatly influenced by the monsoon, bordering with subtropical highland climate (Cwb). Most months of the year are marked by significant rainfall. The short dry season has little impact. The average temperature in Kedungkandang is 23.7 °C. In a year, the average rainfall is 2153 mm.

See also 

 Districts of East Java
 List of districts of Indonesia

References

External links 
 Official website of Kecamatan Kedungkandang

Districts of East Java
Malang